David George Joseph Richardson (December 11, 1940 – December 27, 2022) was a Canadian professional ice hockey winger who played 45 games in the National Hockey League with the Chicago Black Hawks, Detroit Red Wings, and New York Rangers between 1963 and 1967. The rest of his career, which lasted from 1960 to 1974, was spent in various minor leagues.

Career statistics

Regular season and playoffs

References 

 

1940 births
2022 deaths
Baltimore Clippers players
Buffalo Bisons (AHL) players
Canadian ice hockey left wingers
Chicago Blackhawks players
Detroit Red Wings players
Edmonton Oil Kings (WCHL) players
Fort Wayne Komets players
Los Angeles Blades (WHL) players
Memphis South Stars players
New York Rangers players
People from Saint Boniface, Winnipeg
St. Louis Braves players
St. Paul Rangers players
San Diego Gulls (WHL) players
Ice hockey people from Winnipeg
Sudbury Wolves (EPHL) players
Winnipeg Maroons players
Winnipeg Rangers players